Lucas Carl Edvard Bergström (born 5 September 2002) is a Finnish professional footballer who plays as a goalkeeper for Premier League club Chelsea.

Club career

Chelsea
Bergström joined English Premier League side Chelsea from his native side TPS in 2018. He made his youth debut in the final game of 2018–19 season against Reading and turned professional in September 2019. On 14 September 2021, Bergström was named among substitutes for the Champions League group match against Zenit Saint Petersburg at home.

Loan to Peterborough United
In July 2022, Bergström was sent on loan to Peterborough United in the League One. On 30 July, He made his professional debut in a 3–2 win in a League One match against Cheltenham Town.

International career
Bergström has represented Finland at under-16 and under-17 levels. He was called up to under-21 squad between 2021 and 2022 ahead of 2023 UEFA European Under-21 Championship qualification.

Career statistics

Club

Notes

References

2002 births
Association football goalkeepers
Turun Palloseura footballers
Chelsea F.C. players
Peterborough United F.C. players
Expatriate footballers in England
Finland youth international footballers
Finland international footballers
Finnish expatriate footballers
Finnish expatriate sportspeople in England
Finnish footballers
Living people
Swedish-speaking Finns
Pargas Idrottsförening players